Technoflex International, Inc. (commonly named Technoflex) is a Canadian company headquartered in Bois-des-Filion, Canada that designs, develops and distributes products made from 100% recycled post-consumer materials. The company was founded in 1993 in Longueuil, Canada by former CEO Jean-Luc Hebert and Pierre Bourgeois.

History

In 2009, Technoflex became part of a private Canadian consortium. The new owners aimed to position Technoflex as a market leader in their industry sector. A year later, in 2010, the head office and the manufacturing operations of Technoflex moved to a new facility on Montreal’s North Shore to ensure high potential growth. In 2014, Technoflex create a partnership with CCPME (Desjardins Development capital) to ensure its fast growth by financing some of its operations with Desjardins Group development capital. CCPME is an investment fund that provides Québec SMEs patient capital to support them in their expansion, R&D and business acquisition.

Industry Sectors

Retail
The core business of Technoflex is retail. They mainly manufacture and distribute retail products for the end consumer to home improvement retailers all around the globe such as Lowe's, Canadian Tire, Rona, Inc., Brico Dépôt, Castorama and much more. Technoflex begins its first commercializing activities with the Secure Step, an anti-slip stair tread made of recycled rubber tires.

Traffic Safety
The second core business of Technoflex is traffic safety. They manufacture and distribute traffic safety products such as speed bumps, speed humps, parking curbs, signalling bases and much more to specialized companies in Canada and United States.

See also 
Rubber recycling
Plastic recycling
Rubber mulch
Plastic mulch
Compression moulding
Injection moulding
Vulcanization
Waste management

References

Recycling industry
Plastic recycling